Song Bok-hee (27 April 1927 – 8 June 2022), also known professionally as Song Hae, was a South Korean television music show host and singer. He had been the host of the longest running music show National Singing Contest from 1988 until his death in 2022, and was also a veteran of the Korean War.

Early life 
Song Bok-hee was born on 27 April 1927 in modern-day Chaeryŏng-gun, South Hwanghae Province in North Korea. His family was part of the Yeosan Song clan. Song started as a singer who majored in operatic singing in Haeju conservatory of music in 1949.

During the Korean War, he fled via boat to the south, arriving in the port of Busan. He later used the stage name, Hae (meaning sea), as a memory of this voyage. Song served as a military signaller for the South, and claimed to have transmitted the message for the ceasefire of the Korean War.

Career 
In 1955, Song Hae debuted in the Changgong musical troupe. In 1988, at the age of 60, Song became the emcee for Korea Sings, a position he held until his death in 2022.

Personal life and death
In 1953, Song married his wife, Suk Ok-ee. In 1986, his son Chang-jin (19661986) was killed in a bike accident on the Hannam Bridge. On 20 January 2018, Ok-ee passed away.

Song died at his home in Gangnam of Seoul on 8 June 2022, aged 95. He 
was cremated at a crematory in Gimcheon and his ashes were buried at the family cemetery nearby Songhae Park in Daegu on June 10, 2022.

Filmography

Television shows

Film

Awards and honors

References

External links
 
 

1927 births
2022 deaths
Trot singers
South Korean television presenters
South Korean radio presenters
South Korean male comedians
South Korean male singers
South Korean military personnel of the Korean War
Yeosan Song clan
South Korean Buddhists
People from South Hwanghae
People from Chaeryong County